The Blockhouse is a 1973 drama film directed by Clive Rees and starring Peter Sellers and Charles Aznavour. It is based on a 1955 novel by Jean-Paul Clébert. It was filmed entirely in Guernsey in the Channel Islands and was entered into the 23rd Berlin International Film Festival.

Premise
On D-Day, a mixed group of forced labourers held by German forces take shelter from the bombardment inside a German bunker, but are then entombed when the entrances are blocked by shelling damage. By coincidence, the bunker is a storehouse, so the prisoners have enough food and wine to last them for years. However, they are trapped not for years but permanently, and the film analyses how they deal with their underground prison, with their relationships, and with death.

Cast
 Peter Sellers as Rouquet
 Charles Aznavour as Visconti
 Jeremy Kemp as Grabinski
 Per Oscarsson as Lund
 Peter Vaughan as Aufret
 Nicholas Jones as Kromer
 Leon Lissek as Kozhek
 Alfred Lynch as Larshen

Production
The book and film appear to have been inspired by a possibly true story: On 25 June 1951, Time magazine reported that two German soldiers claimed to have been trapped for six years in an underground storehouse in Babie Doły, Poland.

Edgar Bronfman Jnr, when only a teenager, was working on one of his father's films in London while on summer vacation. He came across a script called The Blockhouse by John Gould and Clive Rees. In the summer of 1972 Bronfman and Anthony Rufus-Isaacs combined to produce the film, which was shot in Guernsey (Channel Islands), under the direction of Rees. Filming took place in June 1972.

"I've fallen in love with producing" said Bronfman "and I plan to make it my life's work."

"It's a film for the connoisseurs of cinema," said Sellers. "It's a very heavy movie. It could easily put you on a downer... Clive Rees, who directed it, is brilliant, every bit as good as Stanley Kubrick.

Release
The film was shown at the Berlin Film Festival but was never given a general release in Britain. Hemdale recut the film adding footage to show time passing, and putting in a new ending where the two lead characters survived. (In real life the two survivors died almost immediately after being released.) Cannon Films initially acquired U.S. theatrical rights, and gave it a limited release beginning in January 1974.

The film was initially released on DVD by MGM in 2005, and later re-released on Blu-ray by Powerhouse Films in January 2022.

Reception
TV Guide states that "the film tries to study men in a terrible, claustrophobic setting, but it never reveals the true nature of the characters or a metaphysical reason for their predicament. A worthy idea that sadly goes nowhere." However, the film does currently hold a 73% approval rating (based on 126 reviews) on Rotten Tomatoes.

See also
The Cavern (1964)

References

External links
 
 

1970s war drama films
1973 films
British war drama films
1970s English-language films
Films based on French novels
Films set in the Channel Islands
Films set in Guernsey
Golan-Globus films
Films scored by Stanley Myers
1973 drama films
British World War II films
1970s British films
Films set in bunkers